The women's 100 metres was an event at the 1980 Summer Olympics in Moscow. The competition was held on July 25, 1980, and on July 26, 1980.

Results

Heats

The heats were held on Friday July 25, 1980.

Heat 1

Heat 2

Heat 3

Heat 4

Heat 5

Quarterfinals
The quarterfinals were held on Friday July 25, 1980.

Quarterfinal 1

Quarterfinal 2

Quarterfinal 3

Semifinals
The semifinals were held on Saturday July 26, 1980.

Semifinal 1

Semifinal 2

Final

The final was held on Saturday July 26, 1980.

See also
 1976 Women's Olympic 100 metres (Montreal)
 1978 Women's European Championships 100 metres (Prague)
 1982 Women's European Championships 100 metres (Athens)
 1983 Women's World Championships 100 metres (Helsinki)
 1984 Women's Olympic 100 metres (Los Angeles)

References

External links
Times

 1
100 metres at the Olympics
1980 in women's athletics
Women's events at the 1980 Summer Olympics